is a commercial and entertainment district in Toshima, Tokyo, Japan. Toshima ward offices, Ikebukuro station, and several shops, restaurants, and enormous department stores are located within city limits. It  is considered the second largest adult entertainment district in Tokyo.

Transportation
At the center of Ikebukuro is the train and subway station, a huge urban gathering shared by the JR East lines, the Seibu Ikebukuro Line and the Tōbu Tōjō Line. It is one of the main commuter hubs in the western Yamanote area of Tokyo. Ikebukuro Station is the third-busiest station in Japan, and the world.

Cultural attractions
Around the station are the Seibu and Tōbu department stores. East of the station, on the site of Sugamo Prison, stands Sunshine 60, which was the tallest building in Asia at the time of its construction.

Opened in 1978, Sunshine 60 contains Sunshine City, a large and popular shopping mall with various attractions including an aquarium, a Pokémon Center and cat cafés. Adjacent to Sunshine City, on Meiji Dori, is what was previously called the Toyota Ikebukuro Building which housed a multi-floor Toyota Autosalon Amlux showroom from 2000 to 2013. The building is now called Sunshine City Annex since 2019. Otome Road, a center for otaku culture and shopping district for anime and manga aimed at women, is located nearby. Marui and Don Quijote also have department stores in the area. The principal electronics retailer in Ikebukuro is Bic Camera. There is a small pleasure district located in Nishi-Ikebukuro, similar to Shinjuku's Kabukichō.

The Tokyo Metropolitan Theater is also located near Ikebukuro Station. Opened in 1990, the theater hosts concert, dance, and theater performances. 

The old village of Ikebukuro stood to the northwest of the station. Most of the area on which modern Ikebukuro is built was historically known as Sugamo. In the Taishō and Shōwa periods, the relatively low land prices attracted artists and foreign workers, who lent a somewhat cosmopolitan atmosphere to Ikebukuro.

Etymology
The kanji for Ikebukuro literally means "pond bag" (池袋). Outside the west exit of Ikebukuro Station near an entrance to the Fukutoshin Line is a small plaque explaining how the area used to have multiple lakes, hence the name. There is a small statue of an owl located near the center of the city called , meaning pond owl statue. It is a play on words,  as "owl" (梟 fukurō)  is pronounced similarly to "bag" (袋 fukuro). The owl statue has become a famous meeting place along the lines of the statue of Hachikō located outside Shibuya Station.

Tokyo Chinatown
Ikebukuro is home to many ethnic Chinese who arrived in the 1980s, leading to a variety of Chinese goods and services being provided in the district, which are popular among tourists interested in Chinese culture.  However, the Ikebukuro Chinatown is smaller and less populous than Yokohama's Chinatown just to the south of Tokyo.

Education

Public elementary and junior high schools are operated by the Toshima Ward Board of Education.

 is in Ikebukuro.

Public high schools are operated by the Tokyo Metropolitan Government Board of Education.

Rikkyo Ikebukuro Junior and Senior High School, a private secondary school, is in the area.

Organized crime
The Kyokuto-kai (yakuza syndicate) is headquartered in Ikebukuro.

In popular culture
 Ikebukuro is the setting of the Japanese manga and TV drama Ikebukuro West Gate Park. 
 Ikebukuro is the setting of the Japanese light novel, anime, and manga series Durarara!!.
 "Ikebukuro" is the name of a 16-minute-long track from the Brian Eno album, The Shutov Assembly.
 Ikebukuro is also represented in the multimedial project by King Records Hypnosis Mic: Division Rap Battle
 The train station of Ikebukuro is featured in Lost Judgment.

References

External links

 Tokyo travel
 JapanVisitor

 
Districts of Toshima
Neighborhoods of Tokyo